METAR is a format for reporting weather information. A METAR weather report is predominantly used by aircraft pilots, and by meteorologists, who use aggregated METAR information to assist in weather forecasting.

Raw METAR is the most common format in the world for the transmission of observational weather data. It is highly standardized through the International Civil Aviation Organization (ICAO), which allows it to be understood throughout most of the world.

Report names
The United States Federal Aviation Administration (FAA) in its publication the Aeronautical Information Manual describes the  report as aviation routine weather report while the international authority for the code form, the World Meteorological Organization (WMO), describes it as the aerodrome routine meteorological report. The National Oceanic and Atmospheric Administration (part of the United States Department of Commerce) and the United Kingdom's Met Office both employ the definition used by the FAA. METAR is also known as Meteorological Terminal Aviation Routine Weather Report or Meteorological Aerodrome Report.

Reports

METARs typically come from airports or permanent weather observation stations. Reports are generated once an hour or half-hour at most stations, but if conditions change significantly at a staffed location, a report known as a special (SPECI) may be issued. Some stations make regular reports more frequently, such as Pierce County Airport (ICAO code: KPLU) which issues reports three times per hour. Some METARs are encoded by automated airport weather stations located at airports, military bases, and other sites. Some locations still use augmented observations, which are recorded by digital sensors, encoded via software, and then reviewed by certified weather observers or forecasters prior to being transmitted. Observations may also be taken by trained observers or forecasters who manually observe and encode their observations prior to transmission.

History
The METAR format was introduced 1 January 1968 internationally and has been modified a number of times since. North American countries continued to use a Surface Aviation Observation (SAO) for current weather conditions until 1 June 1996, when this report was replaced with an approved variant of the METAR agreed upon in a 1989 Geneva agreement. The WMO's publication No. 782 "Aerodrome Reports and Forecasts" contains the base METAR code as adopted by the WMO member countries.

Information contained in a METAR
A typical METAR contains data for the temperature, dew point, wind direction and speed, precipitation, cloud cover and heights, visibility, and barometric pressure. A METAR may also contain information on precipitation amounts, lightning, and other information that would be of interest to pilots or meteorologists such as a pilot report or PIREP, colour states and runway visual range (RVR).

In addition, a short period forecast called a TREND may be added at the end of the METAR covering likely changes in weather conditions in the two hours following the observation. These are in the same format as a Terminal Aerodrome Forecast (TAF).

The complement to METARs, reporting forecast weather rather than current weather, are TAFs. METARs and TAFs are used in VOLMET broadcasts.

Regulation
METAR code is regulated by the World Meteorological Organization in consort with the International Civil Aviation Organization. In the United States, the code is given authority (with some U.S. national differences from the WMO/ICAO model) under the Federal Meteorological Handbook No. 1 (FMH-1), which paved the way for the U.S. Air Force Manual 15-111 on Surface Weather Observations, being the authoritative document for the U.S. Armed Forces. A very similar code form to the METAR is the SPECI. Both codes are defined at the technical regulation level in WMO Technical Regulation No. 49, Vol II, which is copied over to the WMO Manual No. 306 and to ICAO Annex III.

METAR conventions
Although the general format of METARs is a global standard, the specific fields used within that format vary somewhat between general international usage and usage within North America. Note that there may be minor differences between countries using the international codes as there are between those using the North American conventions. The two examples which follow illustrate the primary differences between the two METAR variations.

Example METAR codes

International METAR codes
The following is an example METAR from Burgas Airport in Burgas, Bulgaria. It was taken on 4 February 2005 at 16:00 Coordinated Universal Time (UTC).

METAR LBBG 041600Z 12012MPS 090V150 1400 R04/P1500N R22/P1500U +SN BKN022 OVC050 M04/M07 Q1020 NOSIG 8849//91=

METAR indicates that the following is a standard hourly observation.
LBBG is the ICAO airport code for Burgas Airport.
041600Z indicates the time of the observation. It is the day of the month (04) followed by the time of day (1600 Zulu time, which equals 4:00 pm Greenwich Mean Time or 6:00 pm local time).
12012MPS indicates the wind direction is from 120° (east-southeast) at a speed of 12 m/s (23 knots; 27 mph; 44 km/h). Speed measurements can be in knots (abbreviated KT) or meters per second (abbreviated MPS).
090V150 indicates the wind direction is varying from 90° true (east) to 150° true (south-southeast).
+SN indicates snow is falling at a heavy intensity. If any precipitation begins with a minus or plus (-/+), it's either light or heavy.
The lowest "BKN" or "OVC" layer specifies the cloud ceiling.
An M in front of the number indicates that the temperature/dew point is below zero Celsius.
NOSIG is an example of a TREND forecast which is appended to METARs at stations while a forecaster is on watch. NOSIG means that no significant change is expected to the reported conditions within the next 2 hours.
8849//91 indicates the condition of the runway.
 The first two characters indicate which runway is being described.
 If there are two or more runways with the same number, some locations will use three characters (e.g. 25L and 25R). Otherwise, the left runway will use just its number and the right runway will add 50 (e.g. 25 = 25L and 75 = 25R).
 88 indicates all the airport's runways.
 99 indicates repetition of the last message as no new information received.
 4 means the runway is coated with dry snow
 9 means 51% to 100% of the runway is covered
 // means the thickness of the coating was either not measurable or not affecting usage of the runway
 91 means the braking index is bad, in other words the tires have bad grip on the runway
= indicates the end of the METAR

North American METAR codes
North American METARs deviate from the WMO (who write the code on behalf of ICAO) FM 15-XII code. Details are listed in the FAA's Aeronautical Information Manual (AIM), but the non-compliant elements are mostly based on the use of non-standard units of measurement. This METAR example is from Trenton-Mercer Airport near Trenton, New Jersey, and was taken on 5 December 2003 at 18:53 UTC.

METAR KTTN 051853Z 04011KT 1/2SM VCTS SN FZFG BKN003 OVC010 M02/M02 A3006 RMK AO2 TSB40 SLP176 P0002 T10171017=

METAR indicates that the following is a standard hourly observation.
KTTN is the ICAO identifier for the Trenton-Mercer Airport.
051853Z indicates the day of the month is the 5th and the time of day is 1853 Zulu/UTC, or 1:53PM Eastern Standard Time.
1/2SM indicates the prevailing visibility is  SM = statute mile.
SN indicates snow is falling at a moderate intensity; a preceding plus or minus sign (+/-) indicates heavy or light precipitation. Without a +/- sign, moderate precipitation is assumed.
FZFG indicates the presence of freezing fog.
An M in front of the number indicates a negative Celsius temperature/dew point ("minus").
RMK indicates the remarks section follows.

Note that what follows are not part of standard observations outside of the United States and can vary significantly.

AO2 indicates that the station is automated with a precipitation discriminator (rain/snow) sensor. Stations that aren't equipped with a rain/snow sensor are designated AO1.
TSB40 indicates the thunderstorm began at 40 minutes past the hour at 1840 Zulu/UTC, or 1:40 p.m. Eastern Standard Time.
P0002 indicates that  of liquid-equivalent precipitation accumulated during the last hour.
T10171017 is a breakdown of the temperature and dew point in eight digits separated into two groups of four. The first four digits (1017) indicate the temperature. The first digit (1) designates above or below zero Celsius (0=above zero 1=below zero). The next three digits in the group "017" give the temperature in degrees and tenths of a degree Celsius, . The last four digits "1017" indicate the dew point, . Note: ASOS software, as of this update, uses whole degrees in °F to compute the °C values in this group.
= indicates the end of the METAR.
In Canada, RMK is followed by a description of the cloud layers and opacities, in eighths (oktas). For example, CU5 would indicate a cumulus layer with  opacity.

Cloud reporting
Cloud coverage is reported by the number of 'oktas' (eighths) of the sky that is occupied by cloud.

This is reported as:

Flight categories in the U.S. 
METARs can be expressed concisely using so-called aviation flight categories, which indicates what classes of flight can operate at each airport by referring to the visibility and ceiling in each METAR. Four categories are used in the U.S.:

METAR weather codes

METAR abbreviations used in the weather and events section. Remarks section will also include began and end times of the weather events. Codes before remarks will be listed as "-RA" for "light rain". Codes listed after remarks may be listed as "RAB15E25" for "Rain began at 15 minutes after the top of the last hour and ended at 25 minutes after the top of the last hour."

Combinations of two precipitation types are accepted; e.g., RASN (Rain and snow mixed), SHGSSN etc.

U.S. METAR abbreviations
The following METAR abbreviations are used in the United States; some are used worldwide:

METAR and TAF Abbreviations and Acronyms:

U.S. METAR numeric codes
Additional METAR numeric codes listed after RMK.

WMO codes for cloud types
The following codes identify the cloud types used in the 8/nnn part.

See also

 BUFR
 CLIMAT
 IWXXM
 Surface weather observation
 SYNOP
 TAF
 Trend type forecast

Notes

References

External links 

 Aerodrome reports and forecasts: A Users’ Handbook to the Codes

Decoding
METAR Study Guide — approved by the National Weather Services Directorate of Environment Canada
E6BX Online Metar Decoder
FlightUtilities.com METAR and TAF online decoder

Format specifications
OFCM.gov — U.S. Federal Meteorological Handbook No. 1 — Surface Weather Observations and Reports (September 2005).  Complete documentation on the METAR format, PDF.

Software libraries
Perl modules for parsing METAR reports at the CPAN site
PhpWeather is a PHP application (with a GNU General Public License) that parses METAR reports.
pymetar and metar — Python libraries for METAR fetching and parsing
Using METAR data to see the Atmospheric Tide.

Current reports
Selection of worldwide METAR reports from the U.S. NOAA
List of Stations in NOAA database. Use CTRL+F to search for a station. Input four-letter ICAO identifier to Worldwide METAR Data Access from the U.S. NOAA.
CheckWX — Raw and decoded METARs, METAR cycles, trends and graphs for locations worldwide.

Aviation meteorology
Earth sciences data formats
Aviation publications